Riadh Mekideche (Arabic:رياض مقيدش; born 27 July 1995) is a Qatari-Algerian footballer who currently plays for Al-Sailiya.

Personal
Mekideche is the son of former Algeria international Nacer Mekideche.

References

External links
 

Qatari footballers
1995 births
Living people
Al-Rayyan SC players
Al-Markhiya SC players
Al Ahli SC (Doha) players
Al-Wakrah SC players
Al-Sailiya SC players
Qatar Stars League players
Qatari Second Division players
Association football midfielders
Naturalised citizens of Qatar
Qatari people of Algerian descent